Gottfried Wilhelm Leibniz was a major contributor to mathematics, physics, philosophy, theology, logic, and early computer science; independent inventor of calculus in mathematics; inventor of energy and the action principle in physics; jurist, genealogist, diplomat, librarian; worked towards reunification of Catholic and Protestant faiths.

This in-progress article will list all his published and unpublished works primarily based on the Leibniz Library in Hannover, and its online catalog.

Table of works 

Notes:

1. Dates in the table refer to the estimated date of completion of manuscripts if first publication occurred after Leibniz's death (1716).

2. Title and description link to English Wikipedia article if available.

See also 

 Leibniz outline

Transcribed collections 

 Collected Letters 1691–1693 (Hannover, 5th Band)
 Opera omnia, nunc primum collectas; at Bibliothèque nationale de France

References

Gottfried Wilhelm Leibniz
Works by Gottfried Wilhelm Leibniz